Khan Tuman (operation) is a war operation which was done in the town of Khan Tuman, Syrian, and was finally captured by the Syrian army on 29 January 2020.

The operation was commenced in 2016 by the military forces of Syria, Iran (Holy Shrine Defenders), Afghanistan and Hezbollah of Lebanon (beside Syrians) against rebels who intended to occupy the town.

Locality 

Khan-Tuman is a village/town located near the highway of Aleppo-Damascus, that is considered a significant/strategic locality for two sides of the battle in Syria. At the first steps of the operation (Khan-Tuman), the southwestern of Reif (in Syria) was taken back in March 2016 by the Axis of Resistance, and was also led in the capture of many parts of the region -- particularly Khan-Tuman and Me'rateh from rebels. At last, Khan Tuman was entirely liberated in January 2019.

Ceasefire violation 
According to As-Safir newspaper, Takfiris did a widespread violation of ceasefire; it reported: "Jaish al-Fatah (the former Jabhat al-Nusra), whose structure has recently been rebuilt with the alliance of other groups, violated the ceasefire by attacking the strategic area of Khan-Tuman" -- located at the south of Aleppo.

Forces 

At Khan-Tuman operation, the forces of "Axis of Resistance" were formed of: 280 forces from Syria, 70 combatants from Iranian Holy Shrine Defenders of Mazandaran, 850 fighting men from Liwa Fatemiyoun brigade (Afghanistan), 400 combatants from Harakat Hezbollah al-Nujaba (Iraq) who were fighting the rebels.

Casualties 

Al-Nusra casualties were about 400 fighters at Khan-Tuman operation;
on the other side, as a result of the intensity of the attacks, 13 (Iranian) fighters of the 25th Karbala Division --from Mazandaran Province-- were finally killed and around 21 of them were wounded.

Among the Iranian forces whose bodies was sought and brought to Iran, are as follows:

Reza-Hajizadeh, Ali-Abedini, Mohammad-Balbasi, Hassan-Rajaefar from Mazandaran province, Zakaria-Shiri from Qazvin province, Majid-Salmanian from Alborz province, Mehdi-Nazari from Khuzestan province, and Mahmoud Radmehr.

Result 
At an initial step of the fight, Khan-Tuman was possessed by the Jabhat al-Nusra and its allies on Friday, 6 May 2016. But, after a vast battles, Syrian army forces and Axis of Resistance liberated Aleppo city and Khan-Tuman town during an operation on 29 January 2019 in Syria.

See also 
 Belligerents in the Syrian Civil War
Rif Dimashq Governorate

References 

Military operations of the Syrian civil war in 2016
Military operations of the Syrian civil war in 2017
Military operations of the Syrian civil war in 2018
Military operations of the Syrian civil war in 2019
Aleppo Governorate in the Syrian civil war
Military operations of the Syrian civil war involving the Islamic State of Iraq and the Levant
Military operations of the Syrian civil war involving the al-Nusra Front